Presaging Critical Residues in Protein Interfaces Database (PCRPi-DB) is a database of annotated hot spots in protein complexes for which the 3D structure is known.

See also
 Protein structure

References

External links
 http://www.bioinsilico.org/PCRPIDB.

Biological databases
Proteomics